Ikara is a town and local government area (LGA) in Kaduna State, northern Nigeria, located around  north-east from the city of Zaria. Ikara as an LGA consists of these towns and villages: Ikara, Malikachi, Furana, Danlawan, Kurmin Kogi, Janfalan, Auchan, Paki, and Pala.

The Local Government council is chaired by Sadiq Ibrahim Salihu.

Tribes
The main tribes of the people of the area are Hausa and Fulani. Their religions are Islam and Christianity. Their main occupation is farming. They produce Maize, Guinea corn, Beans, Soya beans, Rice, Cassava, Tomatoes, Sugar cane, and many other crop products.

History
The evolution of human settlement in Ikara was greatly influence by environmental, economic and social considerations. the evolution was dated back as far as 1808 when the Jukun people inhabited the town of Ikara. the were immigrants who fled attack of the Muslims scholars from Kano for their refusal to accept Islam. They settled under the Ikara Mountain (Duts Lungi) for a brief period of time than later come settle in a plain area near the mountain. The Jukunawa people were believed to be the founders of Ikara town and name it "Ikara" which mean s word in jukun lets hide here or a hiding place. The Local Government was created in 1976 from the defunct Zaria Province.

Administrative Structure
This Local Government consists of two districts namely:
 Ikara district 
 Paki district

It has six (6) departments, which are as follows:

 Personnel Department
 Finance & Supply Department
 Works Department
 Agricultural Department
 Health Department
 Education Department

Agriculture
This Local Government depends mainly on farming and cattle reading. Ikara has a strong division of labour according to age and sex. Many men have more one occupations such as farmers and traders. The women of Ikare get money through processing of foods and selling food items at home or market places.

Commerce
The commercials activities in the local Government consist of farm products. Below is the list of their main markets.
 Ikara central market/market stalls
 Ikara Tomatoes
 Paki Markets. 
 Auchan Markets.

Education
There are thirteen Secondary Schools in this Local Government namely:-
 Government science secondary school, Ikara
 Government Girls Secondary School Ikara 
 Government Secondary School, Ikara
 Government Vocational Training School, Ikara
 Government Secondary School, Pala
 Government Secondary School, Auchan
 Government Secondary School, Paki
 Government Secondary School Janfala
 Government Secondary School, Malikanchi
 Government Secondary School, Danlawal
 Government Secondary School, Rumi
 Ikara Comprehensive Academy (Private)
Raising Star Academy Ikara
(Private)

Government Secondary School Ikara is a popular secondary school operating in Ikara town, the school is rated high in terms of provision of qualitative education.

Financial Institutions
There is a bank at Ikara and Lead way Assurance is the other financial institution in Ikara LGA
Financial Resources
 Unity Bank Ikara Branch 
 Bank of Agriculture (BOA)
 National Bank of Nigeria
 Federal Statutory allocation which is received on a monthly basis.
 Internally generated revenues from markets, taxable adults and motor parks.

Government Agencies
 Rural Electrification Board (REB)
 NIPOST
 NPC
 NITEL
 Water Board

Geographical Features
There is no distinct geographical features in the LGA The LGA has borders with Makarfi Local Government in the west, Soba in the south, Tudun Wada in Kano State in the North. Kubau by the South

Headquarter
Ikara, Which is a major town is the headquarters

Health Facilities
There are five comprehensive health centers and forty four Health Clinics located in the following Area .
 General Hospital, Ikara
 Comprehensive Health Centre, Paki
 Comprehensive Health Centre Auchan
There are Health Clinics under Ikara LGs with four Health Centers located in Ikara itself.

Industries
Ikara food Processing Company (Tomato)

Judiciary
The Local Government has three courts at the headquarters, Ikara, namely:
 Magistrate court
 Upper Sharia court
 Sharia court
 Customary Court

Mineral Resources
 Precious stone
 Limestone deposits.

People
Hausas/Fulani

Population
194,723 people (2006 census)

Postal Address
P.M.B 1101, Ikara

Religion
Islam is the dominant religion.

Recreational Facilities
The numerous schools and tertiary institutions provide play grounds for sports and recreational activities in L.G.A.

Road Network
Road Construction received attention during the period of Governor Ahmed Mohammed Makarfi.

Roads are enumerated below:
 Ikara –Tashan Yari Road
 Ikara –Panbeguwa Road
 Anchau –Kudaru Road
 Paki Kwanan Dangora Road
 Anchau- Banki- Wagaho Road
 Ikara –Tudun Wada of Kano State Road
 Kurmin Kogi-Yan Marmara Road
 Ikara –Zaria Road
 Ikara –Furana-Dan Lawal

Tertiary Institution
There are two of them namely
 School of Health Technology, Pambeguwa (moved to Kubau)
 Co-operative Institute Ikara

Traditional Rulers
The following areas are administered by Districts Heads. Are:
 Ikara District 
 Kurmin Kogi
 Paki District
 JanFalan 
 Pala District

Tourists Attractions
The LGA is inundated with some rocks and Kogi waterfalls.

Towns and Villages
Ikara, Malikachi, Furana, Danlawan, Kurmin Kogi, Janfalan, Auchan, Paki, Pala,Saulawa, Rumi, Saya-saya, Kuya

Water
The Ikara water dam

Politicians

 Hon. Sani Ahmed Ikara
 Hon. Abdullahi Adamu
 Hon. Tsoho Abubakar
 Hon. Halliru Sambo
 Hon. Tijjani Sani Paki
 Hon. Gambo Lawal Auchan
 Hon. Yusuf Bature Aliyu Auchan
 Hon. Magaji Mudi Ikara
 Hon. Alhassan Muhammad Datti 
 Hon. Yusuf Bala Ikara 
 Hon. Muhammad Dayyabu Paki
 Hon. Sadiq Ibrahim Salihu

Hon. Sadiq Ibrahim Salihu is the current serving Chairman of Ikara Local Government Area of Kaduna State.

References

Populated places in Kaduna State